Russell Hartley Adams (April 22, 1899 – March 19, 1956) was an American attorney who served as Allegheny County District Attorney, including metropolitan Pittsburgh, from January 1942 until December 17, 1945. He was a member of the Republican Party.

Adams was born in Duquesne, Pennsylvania, to Harry H. Adams and Gwendolyn Davis. He died of coronary occlusion in Mt. Lebanon, Pennsylvania.

See also

 District Attorney
 Pittsburgh Police
 Allegheny County Sheriff
 Allegheny County Police Department

References

1899 births
1956 deaths
People from Duquesne, Pennsylvania
Lawyers from Pittsburgh
County district attorneys in Pennsylvania
Pennsylvania Republicans
20th-century American lawyers